Kümo Henriette is a German television series.

See also
List of German television series

External links
 

1978 German television series debuts
1981 German television series endings
Nautical television series
German-language television shows
Das Erste original programming